The SIAM Fellowship is an award and fellowship that recognizes outstanding members of the Society for Industrial and Applied Mathematics (SIAM). The goal of the program is to:

honor SIAM members who are recognized by their peers as distinguished for their contributions to the discipline
help make outstanding SIAM members more competitive for awards and honors when they are being compared with colleagues from other disciplines
support advancement of SIAM members to leadership positions in their own institutions and in the broader society

See also
Fellows of the Society for Industrial and Applied Mathematics
 List of mathematics awards

References

Fellows of learned societies
Awards of the Society for Industrial and Applied Mathematics